Hermann Julius Grüneberg (11 April 1827 – 7 June 1894) was a German chemist and inventor, and together with Julius Vorster the founder of the Chemische Fabrik Kalk.

Biography
Grüneberg was born on 11 April 1827 in Stettin, Province of Pomerania, Prussia, now Szczecin, the capital city of West Pomeranian Voivodeship in Poland. He was the second of six children of the master organ builder August Wilhelm Grüneberg and his wife Caroline Henriette née Breslich from Cammin. One of his brothers was Barnim Grüneberg, who took over his father's organ building business. He died on 7 June 1894 in Cologne, German Empire where he was buried in the Melaten Cemetery.

Honours
A school, the Grüneberg-Schule, and a street, Grünebergstraße, in Kalk, a district of Cologne, are named after him.

See also 
Chemische Fabrik Kalk
Julius Vorster

Bibliography

External links
  Webpage on Herman Julius Grüneberg

1827 births
1894 deaths
19th-century German chemists
German company founders
German chemical industry people
19th-century German businesspeople
Businesspeople from Szczecin
People from the Province of Pomerania
Scientists from Szczecin